Euro key is a locking system which enables people with physical disabilities to access facilities free of charge: for example disabled-accessible elevators and ramps, public toilets on motorways, at train stations, in pedestrian zones, shopping centers, museums, public authorities etc. It was introduced in 1986 by the CBF Darmstadt (Club Behinderter und Freunde) in Darmstadt and environs.
The Euro key is now widely used throughout the following European countries: Austria, Bulgaria, Czechia, Denmark, Finland, France, Germany, Ireland, Italy, Liechtenstein, Norway, Portugal, Romania, Slovakia, Spain, Sweden, Switzerland, UK. The total numbers of Euro key locks are over 100 000 in Europe; about 350 in the US; about 50 in Turkey.

References

External links
 Eurokey system in Switzerland

 Disability
Design
Accessibility
Disability in Switzerland